Double XL is a 2022 Indian Hindi-language comedy film directed by Satramm Ramani, starring Sonakshi Sinha, Huma Qureshi, Zaheer Iqbal and Mahat Raghavendra in lead roles. The story revolves around two plus size women, one from the heartland of Uttar Pradesh and one from urban New Delhi, who discover themselves as they navigate life, celebrate female friendship and embrace body positivity, breaking the myth that beauty corresponds to size. 

Double XL was released on November 4, 2022. It received negative reviews from critics.

Plot 
Two oversized, and talented women living in diagonally opposite parts of the world [one in a small town Meerut, and the other in posh New Delhi], get lambasted from the world around them except for just one or two caring relatives. They decide to get together, and show the world what they can do with their talent. In their effort, they are joined by two young and handsome men, and the foursome begin producing something in London that can have the world gawking at them in admiration. They do succeed in the end.

Cast 
 Sonakshi Sinha as Saira Khanna
 Huma Qureshi as Rajshri Trivedi
 Zaheer Iqbal as Zorawar Rehmani
 Mahat Raghavendra as Shrikant Shreevardhan
 Shobha Khote as Rajshri's grandmother
 Alka Kaushal as Rajshri's mother
 Kanwaljeet Singh as Rajshri's father
 Niki Aneja Walia as Zorawar's mother
 Danish Pandor as Viren
 Sachin Shroff as Saurabh Khanna, Saira's brother
 Jagat Rawat as Mausaji
 Swati Tarar as Roli Mausi
 Dolly Singh as Meera
 Digvijay Singh as Ratan
 Isha Dhillon as Nidhi
 Seana Momsen as Roxanne
 Kay Eluvian as Cecile
 Shikhar Dhawan (guest appearance) as himself
 Jimmy Sheirgill at Atul Chhabra (Cameo)
 Kapil Dev (guest appearance) as himself
 Ranveer Singh (guest appearance) as Kapil Dev

Soundtrack 

The music is composed by Sohail Sen and Kanishk Seth while lyrics are written by Mudassar Aziz and Baba Bulle Shah.

Reception 
The movie mostly received negative reviews. Shubhra Gupta for The Indian Express rate the movie 1.5/5 and wrote "Double XL is a massive opportunity wasted. Crashing pity." Saibal Chatterjee of NDTV also rated the movie 1.5/5 stars and wrote "Double XL, with its one-size-fits-all approach, translates into more than just double trouble." Anuj Kumar for The Hindu wrote "More of an essay on body-shaming than a piece of cinema, Double XL is yet another example of good intentions leading to a drab film. "The makers seem so focused on raising the issue and reflecting diversity on screen, that they seem to have forgotten that the noble idea needs to be packaged into a compelling story as well." Suchin Mehrotra for Hindustan Times wrote "Rounding off the group is London-based line producer Zorawar Khan (an unwatchable Zaheer Iqbal). A painfully animated Zaheer seems to be in his own movie entirely as Zorawar, or as he introduces himself - Zo Za Zoo. I wish I was joking." Tushar Joshi for India Today rated 2.5 out of 5 stars and wrote "The sentiment of the filmmaker is to encourage women to embrace their bodies irrespective of the size, frame, and to self-love to free themselves from the shackles of social stigma. Unfortunately, this task feels half-baked and a bit of a misfire in the attempt to give the film a tone of commercial acceptance." Nandini Ramnath of Scroll.in wrote "One of the high points in Double XL is when Rajshri’s mother (Alka Kaushal) shrieks at her: what was your dream, when did you have it and pray why?"

References

External links
 

Indian comedy-drama films
2022 films
2020s Hindi-language films
2022 comedy-drama films